3 (The Purple Album) is the third studio album by Danish band Lukas Graham. It was released on 26 October 2018 by Copenhagen Records, Then We Take the World and Warner Bros. Records. The album features songs about "growing up and moving on". The band toured in support of the album in 2019. The album debuted at number one in Denmark while on the singles chart, "Love Someone" stayed atop for an eighth week, "Not a Damn Thing Changed" rose back up to number two and the other eight album tracks also entered.

Background 
Events in the lives of the band post the Blue Album in 2015 such as funerals, suicide, birth, marriage and awards influenced the Purple Album. The album opens with "Not a Damn Thing Changed", which a dedication at the end of the song in memory of a lost friend. "Lullaby" was influenced by the birth of his daughter.

A conversation between Forchhammer and Dan Wilson in relation to political songs sparked the idea for a redemption song. Amy Wadge and Forchhammer were working on Lullaby when Wadge was inspired to come out with lyrics used in the redemption song. The opening of the song references Bob Marley and Lennon. Forchhammer has stated that Marley was one of the biggest inspirations for him; Marley's Redemption Song, a reminder of war and the direct impact it had on his childhood.

"Love Someone" and "Promise" is dedicated to Forchhammer's wife while "Unhappy" is about sorting out disagreements between the two.

Critical reception
Mark Kennedy of the Fort Wayne Journal Gazette called the album full of "regret and moodiness" and noted that it is "also largely shorn of the upbeat tempos and hip-hop elements that made his [Graham's] last album so successful. This is a truly melancholy Dane." Kennedy ultimately felt that the album leaves the listener feeling "bummed out".

Track listing

Notes
  signifies a co-producer
  signifies an additional producer
  signifies a vocal producer

Personnel
Lukas Graham
 Lukas Forchhammer – vocals
 Mark "Lovestick" Falgren – drums (track 10)
 Magnus Larsson – bass guitar (5, 7, 10)

Additional musicians

 Rissi – piano (all tracks), synthesizer (3), percussion (4), programming (4–6, 9), bass guitar (5); additional vocals, guitar, Wurlitzer (7); organ (9)
 Hennedub – drums (1), additional drums (3)
 Don Stefano – strings (1), additional vocals (7)
 Rasmus Hedegaard – synthesizer (1)
 Pilo – drums (2–4, 6, 8–10), programming (2–10), bass guitar (3), organ (4, 8, 9), percussion (5, 7)
 Armen Ksajikian – cello (2, 4, 6, 8)
 Cecilia Tsan – cello (2, 4, 6, 8)
 Charlie Tyler – cello (2, 4, 6, 8)
 David Low – cello (2, 4, 6, 8)
 Elizabeth Wright – cello (2, 4, 6, 8)
 Giovanna Clayton – cello (2, 4, 6, 8)
 Alyssa Park – concertmaster, violin (2, 4, 6, 8)
 Timothy Loo – conductor, orchestral arrangement (2, 4, 6, 8)
 Niall Ferguson – orchestral arrangement (2, 4, 6, 8)
 Caroline Buckman – viola (2, 4, 6, 8)
 Diana Wade – viola (2, 4, 6, 8)
 Erik Rynearson – viola (2, 4, 6, 8)
 Luke Maurer – viola (2, 4, 6, 8)
 Michelle Gasworth – viola (2, 4, 6, 8)
 Stefan Smith – viola (2, 4, 6, 8)
 Alwyn Wright – violin (2, 4, 6, 8)
 Charlie Bisharat – violin (2, 4, 6, 8)
 Christian Hebel – violin (2, 4, 6, 8)
 Kevin Kumar – violin (2, 4, 6, 8)
 Mark Robertson – violin (2, 4, 6, 8)
 Sarah Thornblade – violin (2, 4, 6, 8)
 Tami Hatwan – violin (2, 4, 6, 8)
 Viola Schwartz Forchhammer – samples (2)
 David LaBrel – guitar (4, 6, 8, 10)
 Wade Jones – guitar (4)
 Brittany "Chi" Coney – additional vocals, drums (5)
 Denisia "Blu June" Andrews – additional vocals (5–7)
 Morgan Price – baritone saxophone, tenor saxophone (5)
 Nicolaic Wendelboe – organ (5)
 Will Herrington – organ (5)
 Raymond Mason – trombone (5)
 William Aukstik – trumpet (5)
 Jacques Loui Bruun – percussion (9)
 Katie Pearlman – additional vocals (10)

Technical
 Randy Merrill – mastering
 Serban Ghenea – mixing (1)
 John Hanes – mixing (1)
 Delbert Bowers – mixing (2–4, 6–8, 10)
 Vivid – mixing (5)
 Mark "Spike" Stent – mixing (9)
 David LaBrel – audio engineering, recording
 Vince Chiarito – engineering (5)
 Nick Mac – engineering assistance (1–3, 5–10)

Charts

Weekly charts

Year-end charts

Certifications

References

2018 albums
Lukas Graham albums
Warner Records albums